David Sanders may refer to:
 William David Sanders (1951–1999), known as Dave Sanders, was a teacher killed during the Columbine High School massacre. Sanders is known for having helped to save the lives of a number of students and staff members prior to being fatally shot by the gunmen. 
 David Sanders (baseball) (born 1979), baseball pitcher
 David Sanders (biologist), associate professor of biological sciences at Purdue University
 David J. Sanders (born 1975), member of the Arkansas State Senate
 David Sanders, the captain of FedEx Flight 705
 Davy Sanders, character in Alabama Moon